Soumaya Ourghui is a Tunisian football former player and current manager. She played as a goalkeeper and has represented the Tunisia women's national team, of which she is now the goalkeeping coach.

Club career
Ourghui has played for ISSEP Kef in Tunisia.

International career
Ourghui capped for Tunisia at senior level during the 2008 African Women's Championship.

See also
List of Tunisia women's international footballers

References

External links

Year of birth missing (living people)
Living people
Tunisian women's footballers
Women's association football goalkeepers
Tunisia women's international footballers
Tunisian football managers
Female association football managers
Women's association football managers